Fawzi Rasmy (born 1935) is an Egyptian weightlifter. He competed in the men's lightweight event at the 1960 Summer Olympics.

References

1935 births
Living people
Egyptian male weightlifters
Olympic weightlifters of Egypt
Weightlifters at the 1960 Summer Olympics
Sportspeople from Alexandria
20th-century Egyptian people